Lønset is a village in Oppdal municipality in Trøndelag county, Norway.

Lønset Church is located in the village and it is the parish church for the western part of Oppdal municipality.

Media gallery

References

Villages in Trøndelag
Oppdal